Pierre Korb (Mulhouse 20 April 1908 – 22 February 1981) was a French association footballer. He played for FC Mulhouse and FC Sochaux, earned 12 caps and scored 2 goals for the France national football team, and was included in the 1934 FIFA World Cup finals squad.

References

1908 births
1981 deaths
French footballers
France international footballers
Ligue 1 players
Ligue 2 players
FC Mulhouse players
FC Sochaux-Montbéliard players
1934 FIFA World Cup players
Footballers from Mulhouse
Association football forwards 
People from Alsace-Lorraine